Peter Nørklit Knudsen (born 14 April 1973) is a retired Danish football midfielder. Besides Denmark, he has played in Italy.

References

1973 births
Living people
Danish men's footballers
Akademisk Boldklub players
S.S.C. Bari players
Ølstykke FC players
Danish Superliga players
Serie A players
Association football midfielders
Danish expatriate men's footballers
Expatriate footballers in Italy
Danish expatriate sportspeople in Italy
People from Glostrup Municipality
Sportspeople from the Capital Region of Denmark